Ammon (Greek ) was a bishop of Elearchia, in Thebaid, in the 4th and 5th centuries. To him is addressed the canonical epistle of Theophilus of Alexandria.<ref>ap. Synodicon Beveregii, vol. i. pt. 1, p. 170</ref> Papebrochius published in a Latin version his Epistle to Theophilus, De Vita et Conversalione SS. Pachomii et Theodori''. It contains an Epistle of St. Antony.

References

4th-century Egyptian bishops
5th-century Egyptian bishops
5th-century Byzantine writers